Rich Hickey is a computer programmer and speaker, known as the creator of the Clojure programming language. Clojure is a Lisp dialect built on top of the Java Virtual Machine.  He also created or designed ClojureScript and the Extensible Data Notation (EDN) data format.

Before Clojure, he developed dotLisp, a similar project based on the .NET Framework. Hickey is an independent software developer and a consultant with over 20 years of experience in many facets of software development. He has worked on scheduling systems, broadcast automation, audio analysis and fingerprinting, database design, yield management, exit poll systems, and machine listening.

He spent about 2½ years working on Clojure, much of that time working exclusively on Clojure without external funding, before releasing it to the world in 2007. In 2012, Datomic, a proprietary distributed database was launched which coincided with the incorporation of Cognitect.   Since 2013, he is the chief technology officer of Cognitect, which was acquired by Nubank in 2020.

Papers 
 . Reprinted in

References

External links
 Transcripts of talks
 Recorded talks

Programming language designers
Lisp (programming language) people
Free software programmers
Year of birth missing (living people)
Living people